Sheridan is a town in the U.S. state of Wyoming and the county seat of Sheridan County. The town is located halfway between Yellowstone Park and Mount Rushmore by U.S. Route 14 and 16. It is the principal town of the Sheridan, Wyoming, Micropolitan Statistical Area which encompasses all of Sheridan County. The 2010 census put the town's population at 17,444 and the Sheridan, Wyoming, Micropolitan Statistical Area at 29,116, making it the 421st-most populous micropolitan area in the United States.

History
The city was named after General Philip Sheridan, Union cavalry leader in the American Civil War.
Several battles between US Cavalry and the Sioux, Cheyenne, Arapaho, Shoshone, and Crow Indian tribes occurred in the area in the 1860s and 1870s before the town was built.

In 1878, trapper George Mandel built a cabin on Big Goose Creek, reconstructed today in the Whitney Commons park near the Sheridan County Fulmer Public Library. Jack Dow surveyed the townsite for Sheridan in 1882, at the behest of John Loucks, first mayor of the town who had served under Gen. Sheridan.

In the early 1880s, the nearby town of Big Horn was larger in population. In 1888, Sheridan County split off of Johnson County, and voters chose Sheridan as the county seat in a run-off election. The arrival of the Burlington and Missouri Railroad in 1892 boosted Sheridan's economic status, leading to the construction of the Sheridan Inn, where Buffalo Bill Cody was once a financial partner. Railroad maintenance facilities and railroad-tie treatment plants were significant employers in Sheridan's first decades. The railroad created numerous side industries as well as export opportunities for raw materials. Maps of the day show Sheridan as part of the "hinterland" providing raw goods to cities like Chicago. For the next twenty years the economy and population boomed.

Numerous coal mines funded by Chicago investors opened along Tongue River north of Sheridan in the 1890s, sparking immigration, and a major building boom that built Sheridan's brick downtown district. By 1910, an electric streetcar line, one of the only in the state, connected the mining towns of Monarch, Dietz, and Acme to Sheridan.

Sheridan was initially settled by farmers from midwestern states like Illinois, and a few people who came up the cattle trails from Texas, like John B. Kendrick, who went on to be a cattle tycoon and Governor of Wyoming. Many immigrants from Poland, Italy, Greece, Germany, Mexico, and Japan settled in Sheridan, finding work in coal mines, railroad, or agriculture. One notable Muslim immigrant was Zarif Khan, a charismatic Afghani tamale and hamburger vendor from what is now Pakistan whose neighborly generosity is still remembered in Sheridan. Many Polish families came from the Jaworzynka village in southern Poland. English immigrants who settled in the area were overwhelmingly farmers.

Agriculture played a major role in Sheridan County's early economy. By the 1920s, Sheridan was an agricultural processing center for wheat, dairy, and sugar beets, with a stockyard for cattle shipping by rail. Many hobos rode the rails to Sheridan in the 1920s and 1930s, seeking employment in agriculture and ranches. From 1935 through 1939, Sheridan was considered the state capital of the proposed state of Absaroka, a secessionist movement that proved unsuccessful.

The role of underground coal mining declined in the 1950s when demand for coal to power steam locomotives declined due to adoption of diesel locomotives. As coal mine towns dwindled, many employees moved into Sheridan and found other lines of work. The economy boomed in the 1970s with the construction of strip mines along Tongue River in Montana. Many subdivisions were built on former small farms outside of Sheridan in the 1970s and 1980s as the dairy, wheat, and sugar beet industry consolidated to other areas in Montana and South Dakota with more production capacity.

Tourism has long been a significant factor in Sheridan's economy and community life. Numerous guest ranches including Eaton's Ranch hosted guests that arrived by rail. Books like Diary of a Dude Wrangler and Hell Among the Yearlings document this history. Many dude ranch guests moved to Sheridan permanently, leaving a lasting influence on the area's economy, cultural life, and charity institutions. Today Sheridan has a number of local educational and community foundations, and almost 400 non-profits. Notable community-funded entities include a large Y.M.C.A. recreation center, and the WYO Theater.

In the 21st century, Sheridan is the economic center for a large area spanning three counties in north-central Wyoming and southern Montana. The town has a relatively diversified service economy — including government, healthcare, education, real estate, mining, and financial services, with a growing manufacturing sector — in contrast to many communities in Wyoming that rely mostly on natural resource extraction, government jobs, or national park tourism.

Rodeo culture and cowboy/American Indian influences
Sheridan has a strong rodeo culture that draws from ranching history as well as a tradition of catering to the wild-west entertainment and shopping tastes of locals and tourists. The Sheridan WYO Rodeo was established in 1931 to provide entertainment and economic development following the success of the PK Ranch Rodeos in 1928 and 1929. It was a professional rodeo from the beginning but took a hiatus because of the Second World War in 1942 and 1943. It returned as a working cowboy rodeo in 1944 with a new name, the Bots Sots Stampede. In 1951 it resumed as the Sheridan-Wyo-Rodeo and became a professional rodeo again in 1966.

In 1953, the Miss Indian America Pageant and All-American Indian Days, "an interracial project in human relations," was founded to celebrate American Indian culture.

The mix of cowboy and American Indian pageantry is still a major flavor in Sheridan's annual summer celebrations, akin to rodeos in other reservation-border towns like Pendleton, Oregon. Sheridan's milieu of cowboy-Indian cross-pollination and community relations provided part of the inspiration for the Walt Longmire mystery novel and TV series created by local author Craig Johnson.

Though Sheridan primarily celebrates its western culture through rodeo, the town's history and culture includes major industrial, commercial, and recreational influences.

Geography and climate
Sheridan is located at  (44.796720, −106.958970).

Climate 
Sheridan experiences a semi-arid climate (Köppen BSk), with cold, dry winters and hot, wet summers, though summers in recent years have been trending more dry.

Economy
Like many towns in the western United States, Sheridan's early industries included cattle ranching, logging, coal mining, railroading, agriculture, and small factories including a flour mill, brewery, commercial registered agents, and sugarbeet refinery. Residents today find employment in many fields including nearby coal mines; education; coal bed methane extraction; health care; retailing; banking; law firms; city, county, and state government; National Forest; home construction; and a large number of small businesses; farming; and ranching.

Transportation
Intercity bus service is available in Sheridan through Jefferson Lines. Local service is provided by the Goose Creek Transit and the Sheridan Trolley runs from Memorial Day through Labor Day.

Sheridan is served by Sheridan County Airport, located southwest of town. Bighorn Airways offers airplane and helicopter air charter service, as well as an aircraft repair and installation center. United Express, operated by SkyWest Airlines, offers scheduled nonstop flights to Denver, Colorado.

Education
Public education in the city of Sheridan is provided by Sheridan County School District #2. There are six elementary, two junior (or middle) schools-Sheridan Junior High and The Wright Place, and two high schools-Sheridan High School and Ft. Mackenzie High Schools. The Wright Place and Ft. Mackenzie High School are considered alternative education programs. In addition the district supports home schooling. Private and parochial schools are operated by Normative Services, Holy Name Parish (Holy Name School), and several religion-based organizations. The Northern Wyoming Community College District offers post-secondary education with Sheridan College.

Sheridan has a public library, a branch of the Sheridan County Public Library System.

Demographics

2010 census
As of the census of 2010, there were 17,444 people, 7,680 households, and 4,296 families residing in the city. The racial makeup of the city was 94.9% White, 0.4% African American, 1.0% Native American, 0.9% Asian, 0.1% Pacific Islander, 0.9% from other races, and 1.8% from two or more races. Hispanic or Latino of any race were 4.3% of the population.

There were 7,680 households, of which 26.9% had children under the age of 18 living with them, 42.0% were married couples living together, 9.6% had a female householder with no husband present, 4.3% had a male householder with no wife present, and 44.1% were non-families. 36.9% of all households were made up of individuals, and 13.7% had someone living alone who was 65 years of age or older. The average household size was 2.17 and the average family size was 2.86.

The median age in the city was 39.2 years. 22% of residents were under the age of 18; 9.7% were between the ages of 18 and 24; 25% were from 25 to 44; 27.5% were from 45 to 64; and 15.8% were 65 years of age or older. The gender makeup of the city was 49.6% male and 50.4% female.

2000 census
As of the census of 2000, there were 15,804 people, 7,005 households, and 4,062 families residing in the city. The population density was 1,862.4 people per square mile (718.7/km2). There were 7,413 housing units at an average density of 873.6 per square mile (337.1/km2). The racial makeup of the city was 95.93% White, 0.22% African American, 0.97% Native American, 0.46% Asian, 0.20% Pacific Islander, 0.85% from other races, and 1.37% from two or more races. Hispanic or Latino of any race were 2.64% of the population. 24.0% were of German, 12.5% English, 10.3% Irish, 7.6% United States or American, 5.9% Norwegian and 5.3% Polish ancestry according to Census 2000.

There were 7,005 households, out of which 26.7% had children under the age of 18 living with them, 45.0% were married couples living together, 9.7% had a female householder with no husband present, and 42.0% were non-families. 35.8% of all households were made up of individuals, and 14.8% had someone living alone who was 65 years of age or older. The average household size was 2.21 and the average family size was 2.88.

In the city, the population was spread out, with 23.1% under the age of 18, 9.5% from 18 to 24, 26.3% from 25 to 44, 24.2% from 45 to 64, and 16.9% who were 65 years of age or older. The median age was 39 years. For every 100 females, there were 92.7 males. For every 100 females age 18 and over, there were 89.0 males.

The median income for a household in the city was $31,420, and the median income for a family was $40,106. Males had a median income of $30,829 versus $19,783 for females. The per capita income for the city was $18,500. About 8.6% of families and 11.2% of the population were below the poverty line, including 16.1% of those under age 18 and 6.5% of those age 65 or over.

Government and infrastructure
Sheridan is governed via the mayor-council system. The city council consists of six members elected which are elected at large in staggered terms. The mayor is elected in a citywide vote. The city has its own police department.

The United States Postal Service operates the Sheridan Post Office.

The Wyoming Department of Family Services Juvenile Services Division operates the Wyoming Girls' School, located in unincorporated Sheridan County, near Sheridan. The facility was operated by the Wyoming Board of Charities and Reform until that agency was dissolved as a result of a state constitutional amendment passed in November 1990.

Local media
Radio
 KROE AM 930
 KWYO AM 1410
 KHRW FM 92.7
 KYTI FM 93.7
 KZWY FM 94.9
 KLGT FM 96.5
 KZZS FM 98.3
 KOWY FM 102.3
 KLQQ FM 104.9

Two stations are public radio stations; KSUW FM 91.3, is a Wyoming Public Radio station and KPRQ FM 88.1, via translator from Montana State University - Billings in Billings, Montana.

Television
Five television stations are available in Sheridan:
 KTVQ (CBS) (Billings)
 KSWY (NBC) (Casper)
 KSGW-TV (ABC) (simulcasts KOTA-TV in Rapid City)
 translator for PBS affiliate KCWC-DT in Lander
 translator for KTWO (ABC) from Casper

Newspapers
The Sheridan Press is the local newspaper. The Billings Gazette and Casper Star Tribune are regional newspapers available in Sheridan.

Representation in media 
In 1984, Queen Elizabeth II visited Sheridan and stayed at Canyon Ranch as a guest of Wyoming U.S. Senator Malcolm Wallop, the brother of lifetime friend Lady Porchester whose husband, George Herbert, 8th Earl of Carnarvon, was the queen's godson. It remained rather unpublicized before local reports of the Queen shopping at local stores caused international media outlets to hound the area, seeking to capture the obscure idea of British monarchy gathering at a ranch in the 'Old West' nestled beneath the Rocky Mountains. Coverage drastically intensified the following day with the Brighton hotel bombing, a nearly successful assassination attempt on Prime Minister Margaret Thatcher, and reports of the Queen's impromptu call with President Ronald Reagan to discuss the matter.

Several scenes of the 2006 film Flicka were filmed on location in Sheridan. It was based on the novel, My Friend Flicka.

Movies filmed in Sheridan include Into the Homeland, Wild Horses and Endangered Species.

In 1986, MTV hosted the world premiere of Prince's movie Under The Cherry Moon in the city.

Tourism
Sheridan was ranked number one by the True West Magazine in 2006 among the Top Western Towns. It was ranked sixth in 2007. It is a vacation destination and a travel stop, due to its proximity to Interstate 90 and U.S. Route 14.

Top Sheridan area destinations include The Brinton Museum in Big Horn, Wyoming, which exhibits iconic 19th, 20th and 21st century Western and American Indian art in the new 25,000 square-foot Forrest E. Mars, Jr. building and in its historic ranch house on the 620-acre Quarter Circle A Ranch. The museum was established in 1961 by Bradford Brinton's sister Helen Brinton, who wanted to make his historic collection of art available to the public. Exhibits include pieces by Charles M. Russell, Frederic Remington, Edward Borein, Winold Reiss, Thomas Moran, and Hans Kleiber, among many others. The Brinton Museum draws visitors from all 50 states and more than 30 foreign countries annually.

Another top destination is The Sheridan WYO Rodeo, which began in 1931 and is widely regarded as one of the top rodeos in the nation. It draws 25,000 guests to its annual, weeklong western celebration and performance each July at the Sheridan County Fairgrounds. The Sheridan WYO Rodeo recently launched a new Labor Day Weekend destination event called the Cowboy State Elite Rodeo, the only ERA League of Champions Rodeo event in an outdoor arena in the U.S.

Ten sites in and near Sheridan are listed on the National Register of Historic Places, including:

 Trail End State Historic Site - 400 Clarendon Avenue - A mansion finished in 1913 that was the home of John Benjamin Kendrick (1857–1933). Kendrick was a cattle rancher who served as governor of Wyoming before being elected to three terms as a United States senator. Trail End is now a state-operated museum and is known locally as the Kendrick Mansion. Most of the contents of the museum are original to the Kendrick family. The mansion and carriage house were designed by Glenn Charles McAlister, a self-taught architect from Billings, Montana. In 1979 the mansion's carriage house was converted into a small theater for the performing arts, dubbed The Carriage House Theater.

 Quarter Circle A Ranch in Big Horn, Wyoming - just 12 miles south of Sheridan. This historic, 620-acre gentleman's working ranch is home to The Brinton Museum, one of the nation's top western and American Indian Museums. 
 Sheridan County Courthouse (Wyoming) - 224 South Main Street.
 Fort Mackenzie - 1898 Fort Road - Currently a hospital administered by the Veterans Administration.
 Holy Name Catholic School – 260 East Loucks Street - Oldest Catholic school building remaining in the state of Wyoming.
 St. Peter's Episcopal Church - 1 South Tschirgi Street - Noted for its Gothic Revival architecture and stained glass windows.
 The historic Sheridan Inn (1893) - 856 Broadway Street - It has had a rich history of notable guests. 
 Sheridan Main Street Historic District - Main Street from Burkitt to Mandel streets.
 Sheridan Railroad Historic District - 201-841 Broadway, 508-955 N. Gould
 Sheridan Flouring Mills, Inc. - 2161 Coffeen Avenue. The prominent smokestack is a United States Geological Survey map reference station.

Museums in Sheridan include the Sheridan County Museum and King's Saddlery Museum. The latter's exhibits display Western leather work (especially saddles) and cover Western history.

The City of Sheridan maintains nine parks. Kendrick Park, at the corner of Badger and Beaver Streets, includes a children's play area, a seasonal ice cream shop, a swimming pool, chainsaw carvings, and a buffalo and elk conservatory.

Every summer in the second week of July, Sheridan hosts the WYO Rodeo. Rodeo Week events include a parade, the "Sneakers and Spurs" run, a rubber duck race on Big Goose Creek in Kendrick Park, a carnival at the fairgrounds, and a golf tournament at the country club. On the final day of Rodeo Week, a tailgate party and polo game are held in nearby Big Horn, Wyoming, at the Flying H Polo Club.

Notable people

 James B. Aleshire, U.S. Army major general
 Brad Anderson, former CEO of Best Buy
 Jerry Andrus (1918–2007), magician, optical illusionist
 Jim Benepe, professional golfer, won 1988 Beatrice Western Open
 Buffalo Bill Cody, auditioned talent for his Wild West Show off the front porch of the Sheridan Inn
 William Henry Harrison III, U.S. Representative from Wyoming
 John B. Kendrick, Governor of Wyoming (1915–1917) and U.S. Senator (1917–1933)
 Zarif Khan, restaurant owner and investor who lived in Sheridan
 T. Allen Lawson, American artist
Forrest Edward Mars Jr, Candy Heir (Mars, Incorporated) 
 Clint Oldenburg, born in Sheridan and played football for the Washington Redskins
 Louis J. O'Marr, 13th Attorney General of Wyoming
 Romaine Patterson, Sirius Satellite Radio talk show host, activist
 John Pilch, former NBA player
 John Howard Pyle, governor of Arizona, 1951–1955
 Frank J. Rodriguez Sr., Minnesota state representative
 Pete Simpson, state representative from Sheridan County from 1981 to 1984; later administrator at the University of Wyoming
 Oliver Wallop, 8th Earl of Portsmouth, Wyoming state legislator, rancher, and British noble
 Cris Williamson, singer and songwriter
Dan M. "Buck" Brannaman, "horse whisperer" and star of film Buck
Constantine Scollen, famous missionary priest, pastor of the Catholic Church during 1893–1894

References

Further reading
 Georgen, Cynde. In the Shadow of the Bighorns: A history of early Sheridan and the Goose Creek valley of northern Wyoming. Sheridan, Wyoming: Sheridan County Historical Society, 2010. 
 Georgen, Cynde. Snippets of Sheridan County History: 366 Newsy Little Stories from the First 125 Years of Sheridan County, Wyoming, 1888–2013. Sheridan, Wyoming: Sheridan County Historical Society, 2013. 
 Georgen, Cynde A. One cowboy's dream: John B. Kendrick, his family, home, and ranching empire. 2nd edition, revised. Virginia Beach, Virginia: The Donning Company Publishers, 2004. 
 Morton, Sam. Where the rivers run north. Sheridan County Historical Society Press, 2007. 
Popovich, Charles W. Sheridan, Wyoming, and area historical sites: easy reading. 2004.
 Sagebrush scholars of Sagebrush Elementary School, Sheridan, Wyoming. Our Wyoming heritage: as seen through the eyes of the young. 1990.

External links
 City website 
 Sheridan Wyoming
 

 
Cities in Sheridan County, Wyoming
Cities in Wyoming
County seats in Wyoming
Micropolitan areas of Wyoming